Based in San Jose, California, sjDANCEco is a contemporary dance company founded in 2003 by artistic directors Gary Masters and Maria Basile, and Melanie Doerner.  The sjDANCEco is in residence at the San Jose State University.

The sjDANCEco evolved out of the San Jose-based Limón West Dance Project, which Gary Masters founded and directed from 1994 to 1998, with present-day sjDANCEco dancers Maria Basile, Hsiang Hsiu Lin, Raphaël Boumaïla and Robert Regala.  During its first 10 years, sjDANCEco has presented 42 World Premieres, six Revivals, works by master choreographers Donald McKayle and Fred Mathews, and eight works by José Limón during a five-year collaboration with the José Limón Dance Foundation.  In addition, sjDANCEco also provides two annual showcases for new works by professional San Francisco Bay Area choreographers through its two annual ChoreoProject Awards and through its "FESTIVAL @ SANTANA ROW", celebrating National Dance Week.

The sjDANCEco is a 501(c)(3) non-profit organization that serves both the community of San Francisco South Bay residents and the community of local dance artists.  They introduce new audiences to dance and strive to install a lasting appreciation for the art form.

Selected performances
Tango Fatal (2013)
The Moor's Pavane (2012)

See also 
List of Dance Companies

References

Contemporary dance companies
Dance in California
Dance education in the United States
2003 establishments in California
Performing groups established in 2003
Culture in the San Francisco Bay Area
Culture of San Jose, California